Hushdrops are a three-piece rock band from Chicago featuring current and former members of Veruca Salt, Liam Hayes and Plush, The Waco Brothers (through 2020), The Webb Brothers, Josh Caterer, Kevin Tihista, and NRBQ. The band's 2004 debut album Volume One was followed in 2014 by the double album Tomorrow. Drummer Joe Camarillo died unexpectedly in January 2021, just as the group were completing their third album (The Static). In August 2021, it was announced that Pravda Records would release that album in November of that year, partly in tribute to Camarillo. 

Hushdrops resumed performing in September 2021 and well into 2022 with drummer Bill Swartz, drummer John Szymanski, and NRBQ drummer John Perrin.

Members
John San Juan
Jim Shapiro

Former members
Joe Camarillo (born September 3, 1968 - died January 24, 2021; Number Nine, Gear, Skull Orchard, Bad Luck Jonathan, Waco Brothers, NRBQ) - drums

Discography
Volume One (Hushdrops album) (2003)
Tomorrow (Hushdrops album) (2014)
The Static (Hushdrops album) (2021)

References

External links
 Official Bandcamp

Songwriters from Illinois
Rock music groups from Illinois
Musical groups from Chicago